Neri per Caso are an Italian a cappella musical group.

Career 
The group formed in Salerno as Crecason in 1991 and consisted of six elements: Diego and Ciro Caravano (brothers), their cousins Mimì and Gonzalo Caravano (also brothers), Mario Crescenzo and Massimo De Divitiis. The group's name was changed after they met songwriter and producer Claudio Mattone, who saw them performing in Rome all "dressed in black" (in Italian "Neri"). When he asked them why they picked that color and they said it happened purely "by chance" (in Italian "per caso"). In 1995 they won the newcomers section at the Sanremo Music Festival with the song "Le ragazze". Their debut album became platinum after just one week and eventually sold over 700,000 copies. In 1996 they returned to the Sanremo Festival, this time entering the main competition with the song "Mai più sola", and ranked fifth. The subsequent album, Strumenti, sold over 250,000 copies. In 2014 Diego Caravano left the group, being replaced by Moris Pradella, who was replaced by Daniele Blaquier the following year.

Current lineup
 Ciro Caravano (1995-current)
 Gonzalo Caravano  (1995-current)
 Domenico Pablo "Mimì" Caravano (1995-current)
 Mario Crescenzo  (1995-current)
 Massimo de Divitiis  (1995-current)
 Daniele Blaquier  (2015-current)

Former Members
 Diego Caravano  (1995-2014)
 Moris Pradella (2014-2015)

Discography  
Albums  
     1995 - Le ragazze
     1996 - Strumenti
     1996 - ...And so This Is Christmas
     1997 - Neri per caso
     2000 - Angelo blu
     2002 - La raccolta
     2007 - Solo grandi successi
     2008 - Angoli diversi
     2010 - Donne
2016 – Neri per Caso 2.0
2019 - We Love the Beatles

References

External links
  
 

 

 

Musical groups established in 1991
Musical groups from Campania
Italian pop music groups
1991 establishments in Italy
A cappella musical groups
Sanremo Music Festival winners of the newcomers section